Party

Bela is a town in the Auraiya district of Uttar Pradesh, India. It is midway between and on the road between Auraiya and Kannauj.The main shops of Bela are Mishra Electronics and Electricals and Mishra Building Material and Mishra computer and Prince travels at tiraha.NH 91A passes through Tirwa Road connecting the town to Bidhuna and Kannauj. Transport facilities for going to Delhi, Kanpur, Kannauj can be easily availed through private and public buses.

References

Villages in Auraiya district